Yuri Sergeyevich Zavezyon (born 28 January 1996) is a Russian professional footballer who plays for FC Rotor Volgograd.

Club career
He made his debut for the main squad of FC Kuban Krasnodar on 23 September 2015 in a Russian Cup game against FC Shinnik Yaroslavl. He made his Russian Football National League debut for Kuban on 11 July 2016 in a game against PFC Spartak Nalchik.

References

External links
 

1996 births
People from Yashaltinsky District
Sportspeople from Kalmykia
Living people
Russian footballers
Russia youth international footballers
Association football midfielders
Association football forwards
FC Kuban Krasnodar players
FC Rotor Volgograd players
FC Chertanovo Moscow players
FC Metallurg Lipetsk players
FC Atyrau players
Russian First League players
Russian Second League players
Kazakhstan Premier League players
Russian expatriate footballers
Expatriate footballers in Kazakhstan
Russian expatriate sportspeople in Kazakhstan